Tisdale–Jones House, also known as the New Bern City Schools Administration Building, is a historic home located at New Bern, Craven County, North Carolina.  It was built about 1769, and is a -story, central hall plan frame dwelling with a large two-story rear ell.  In 1958, the New Bern City Board of Education began using the building as offices; in the 1980s it was returned to private residential use.

It was listed on the National Register of Historic Places in 1972.

References

Houses on the National Register of Historic Places in North Carolina
Houses completed in 1769
Houses in New Bern, North Carolina
National Register of Historic Places in Craven County, North Carolina